My Son often refers to Mỹ Sơn, a cluster of ruined temples in Vietnam.

It may also refer to:

 My Son (1925 film), an American silent film directed by Edwin Carewe
 My Son (1928 film), a Soviet film directed by Yevgeni Chervyakov
 My Son (2007 film), a South Korean film directed by Jang Jin
 My Son (2017 film), a French thriller directed by Christian Carion
 My Son (2021 film), an English-language remake of the 2017 film, also directed by Christian Carion
 "My Son" (song), a 1968 song by Jan Howard